Felix Ademola Aladesanmi (born 9 September 1974) is a Nigerian former professional football who played as a midfielder.

Career
Ademola played for Stationery Stores F.C., France-based club RC Lens, Belgian RFC Liège, Colombian team Deportes Tolima, then Skeid Fotball and FK Haugesund and Swedish side Husqvarna FF. He returned to Norway and played for Hamarkameratene, Hønefoss BK, Vard Haugesund and Manglerud Star in Norway. In the second half of 2009 he was loaned out to Årvoll IL.

Personal life
Ademola's son, Kevin Aladesanmi, is a professional footballer.

References

1974 births
Living people
Association football midfielders
Nigerian footballers
Yoruba sportspeople
RC Lens players
RFC Liège players
Deportes Tolima footballers
FK Haugesund players
Hamarkameratene players
Hønefoss BK players
SK Vard Haugesund players
Manglerud Star Toppfotball players
Skeid Fotball players
Categoría Primera A players
Eliteserien players
Nigerian expatriate footballers
Expatriate footballers in Colombia
Expatriate footballers in Belgium
Nigerian expatriate sportspeople in Belgium
Expatriate footballers in France
Nigerian expatriate sportspeople in France
Expatriate footballers in Norway
Nigerian expatriate sportspeople in Norway
Expatriate footballers in Sweden
Nigerian expatriate sportspeople in Sweden
Aladesanmi family
Nigeria international footballers